ISO 704 - Terminology work—Principles and methods

It is an ISO standard,  which establishes the basic principles and methods for preparing and compiling terminologies both inside and outside the framework of standardization, and describes the links between objects, concepts, and their terminological representations. It also establishes general principles governing the formation of designations and the formulation of definitions. Full and complete understanding of these principles requires some background knowledge of terminology work.

The principles are general in nature and this document is applicable to terminology work in scientific, technological, industrial, administrative and other fields of knowledge.

ISO 704:2009 does not stipulate procedures for the layout of international terminology standards, which are treated in ISO 10241.

Revision
ISO 704:2009

References
 ISO Catalogue in the ISO website

00704